Carli Muñoz, better known as Carli Munoz (full name: Carlos C. Muñoz; born October 16, 1948), is a self-taught Puerto Rican jazz and rock pianist, best known for touring with the Beach Boys in the 1970s.

Biography
Although born and raised in San Juan, Puerto Rico, Muñoz' music of choice was jazz.

At age 16, Muñoz travelled to New York City with a rock band he co-founded with Jorge Calderon called The Living End, AKA: Space, which for 18 months served as a house band at a New York club.  Muñoz later moved to Los Angeles, where he worked with Wilson Pickett, Jan and Dean, the Association, George Benson, Charles Lloyd, Chico Hamilton, Wayne Henderson, Les McCann, Peter Cetera and Evie Sands.

From 1970 through 1981, Muñoz toured with the Beach Boys, playing Hammond B3 and piano.  Following his return to Puerto Rico in 1985, Muñoz stayed out of the spotlight.  In December 1998, he opened a restaurant, Carli Cafe Concierto, where he performs jazz music. He often returns to the mainland to perform and record.

References

Post-bop pianists
American jazz pianists
American male pianists
The Beach Boys backing band members
1948 births
Living people
Rock pianists
American rock pianists
20th-century American pianists
American male jazz musicians
20th-century American male musicians